The Yugoslavia men's national basketball team represented the Socialist Federal Republic of Yugoslavia from 1943 until 1992 in international basketball, and was controlled by the Basketball Federation of Yugoslavia.

After World War II, the team steadily improved their rankings and came to be one of the dominant forces of world basketball in the 1970s and the 1980s, along with the United States and Soviet Union, capturing five Olympic medals and eight World Cups, thirteen medals in total, along with another thirteen on the continental level at EuroBasket.

Eleven FIBA Hall of Fame members emerged from the Yugoslav national team: Krešimir Ćosić, Drazen Dalipagic, Ivo Daneu, Mirza Delibašić, Vlade Divac, Dragan Kićanović, Radivoj Korać, Toni Kukoč, Dražen Petrović, Zoran Slavnić and Jure Zdovc

History

1947–1957
Yugoslavia made its European championship debut in EuroBasket 1947, the fifth edition of the tournament. The team placed 13th out of 14 teams in the competition, losing to the Soviet Union and Hungary in the preliminary round, beating the Netherlands but losing to Italy in the semifinal round (placing third in the three-way tie between the teams), and defeating Albania in the 13th/14th classification match.
Yugoslavia's second appearance was at EuroBasket 1953 in Moscow. They dropped an early 27–25 decision against Bulgaria but finished at 3–1 in their preliminary group. In the three-way tie-breaker with Bulgaria and Israel, Yugoslavia ended up in second place to advance to the final round. There, they won 3 but lost 4 to take 6th place overall in the 17-team tournament. Yugoslavia again advanced to the final round at EuroBasket 1955 in Budapest, this time in sole second place with a 3–1 record in the preliminary round pool. Their final round performance was riddled with 6 losses in 7 games, but did include the high point of a 52–49 victory over eventual silver medallist Czechoslovakia on Yugoslavia's way to an 8th-place finish of the 18 entrants. Yugoslavia placed 6th at EuroBasket 1957 in Sofia, where they managed to make two wins in  final round robin, defeating Poland and France to finish at 2–5 for 6th place in the tournament.

1961–1970

Yugoslavia got a bronze at EuroBasket 1963, where they were defeated 72–83 by Poland in semifinal, and then won the Bronze medal game 89–61 against Hungary. They won a silver medal at EuroBasket 1961, where they were defeated 53–60 by Soviet Union in the final. This achievement was followed by another silver medal at the 1963 FIBA World Championship, eventually won by Brazil. At EuroBasket 1965 they were again defeated by Soviet Union in the final. Yugoslavia participated in the 1967 FIBA World Championship, won by Soviet Union, where they placed second. Yugoslavia defeated all opponents except United States in Group A at the 1968 Summer Olympics basketball tournament, in which they were grouped also with Italy, Spain, Puerto Rico, Panama, Philippines, and Senegal.
They advanced to the knockout stage, where they managed to defeat Soviet Union 62–63. They played again against the United States in the final, and were again defeated 65–50. With 16 points scored, Ivo Daneu, who was the scoring leader against Panama, Italy and the United States in the preliminary round, was Yugoslavia's scoring leader also in the final.

At the EuroBasket 1969 they were defeated 81–72 in the final, again by Soviet Union. On this occasion, Ivo Daneu and Krešimir Ćosić were selected in the All-Tournament Team. Kapičić was the scoring leader against Greece, Simonović against Sweden, Daneu against Hungary, Ćosić against Soviet Union and Poland, and Rajković scored 16 pts in the final, followed by Daneu with 12. Yugoslavia won their first gold in a major tournament at the 1970 FIBA World Championship, where they defeated Brazil (55–80), the United States (70–63), and Soviet Union (72–87). Krešimir Ćosić, who led Yugoslavia to one of the greatest runs in international basketball history, was included in the All-Tournament Team. He was the scoring leader against Italy; against Brazil with 19 points, followed by Simonović with 17, against Czechoslovakia, Uruguay, and the United States, followed by Skansi. The scoring leader in the decisive game against Soviet Union was Rajković (14), followed by Jelovac (13).   

Up to 1974 Ivo Daneu was the only Yugoslav player named FIBA Basketball World Cup MVP, and to this day he and Dragan Kićanović remain the only Yugoslav players inducted in it and the FIBA Hall of Fame. Dražen Dalipagić, Dražen Petrović, and Toni Kukoč, on the other hand, are the only World Cup MVP's inducted in both the FIBA Hall of Fame and the Naismith Memorial Basketball Hall of Fame as of 2021.

1971–1978

Yugoslavia won the silver medal at EuroBasket 1971, when they were defeated 69–64 by Soviet Union. Ćosić was named EuroBasket MVP for the first time. He was the scoring leader against Italy, Bulgaria, Poland in the semifinal, and the second against Czechoslovakia, while Simonović was the scoring leader against the latter and the second against Bulgaria and Poland. Kapičić was the scoring leader against Turkey and Israel, and Knežević in the final. In 1973 they won the EuroBasket, defeating Spain in the final. One player (Ćosić) was included in the All-Tournament Team. They followed this success by winning the EuroBasket 1975, for which they were also host country. On this occasion, Ćosić was again awarded FIBA EuroBasket MVP, and to this day ties with Pau Gasol for the player with most EuroBasket MVP's. Yugoslavia were runners-up at the 1974 FIBA World Championship, won by Soviet Union. Dragan Kićanović was named MVP on this occasion. In 1977 they defeated Soviet Union 74–61 in the EuroBasket 1977 final, thus winning their third EuroBasket. Two players (Dalipagić and Slavnić) were included in the All-Tournament team.

Yugoslavia won the 1978 FIBA World Championship. They defeated Canada, South Korea, and Senegal in the Preliminary round; Soviet Union, Brazil,  Italy, United States, Canada, Australia, Philippines in the Semifinal round, and Soviet Union 82–81 in the final. Delibašić tied with Dalipagić for scoring leader against Canada; Dalipagić was the scoring leader against Philippines, Italy, USA, and the Soviet Union; Kićanović against Senegal and Brazil, and Vilfan against South Korea and Australia.

Dražen Dalipagić was named MVP of the tournament, and he, Ćosić, and Kićanović were included in the All-Tournament Team.

1979–1987

Yugoslavia won a bronze medal at EuroBasket 1979, where Ćosić and Kićanović were included in the All-Tournament Team. In 1980, Yugoslavia won their first and only Olympic gold at the 1980 Summer Olympics basketball tournament, to which the United States, as well as Argentina, Puerto Rico, Canada, and China, among others, did not participate due to the American-led boycott, thus withdrawing their national basketball teams from the tournament. Yugoslavia emerged as undefeated from both the preliminary round and the semifinal round. Dalipagić was the scoring leader against Soviet Union, and Kićanović tied with Ćosić, also the rebounding leader, for most assists. Dalipagić was the scoring leader against Brazil and tied with Ćosić for rebounding leader, while Kićanović was the scoring leader against Italy and Cuba in the semifinal round, and again against Italy in the final, won 86–77 by Yugoslavia. They were runners-up at EuroBasket 1981, losing 84–67 to the Soviet Union in the final. They won a bronze medal at the 1982 FIBA World Championship. Kićanović tied with Dalipagić for scoring leader against Czechoslovakia and Australia, and with Radovanović against Spain, and was the scoring leader against the United States and Soviet Union; Avdija against Uruguay, Delibašić against Canada, Vilfan against Colombia, and Dalipagić in the Bronze medal game won 119–117 against Spain. Dragan Kićanović was included in the All-Tournament Team. 
They placed third at the 1984 Summer Olympics Basketball Tournament, in which they were defeated by Spain 61–74 in semifinals. Dražen Petrović was the scoring leader against Spain. They defeated Canada 88–82 in the Bronze medal game, where Dalipagić was the scoring leader. Yugoslavia won a bronze medal at the 1986 FIBA World Championship, where they were defeated by Soviet Union in semifinals but managed to defeat Brazil and win the bronze medal game. Petrović was the tournament's MVP. They placed third at EuroBasket 1987, defeating Spain 87–98 in the Bronze medal game after they were defeated 81–77 by Greece in semifinals. Petrović was the scoring leader against both Greece and Spain.

1988 Summer Olympics
Yugoslavia placed second at the 1988 Summer Olympics Basketball tournament. They placed first in the Group stage, losing only one game to Puerto Rico. They advanced to the knockout stage, defeating Canada 95–73 in quarterfinals and Australia 91–70 in semifinals. They lost the Gold medal game 63–76 to the Soviet Union.

EuroBasket 1989
Yugoslavia won the 26th FIBA EuroBasket regional basketball championship, defeating Greece in the final. In the Preliminary round they were grouped with eventual runner-up Greece, France, and Bulgaria. They defeated Greece 103–68, Bulgaria 78–98, and France 89–106, thus advancing to the knockout stage as undefeated. They defeated Italy 97–80 in semifinal, and won 98–77 over Greece in the Gold medal game. In the final, Dražen Petrović was the assists leader with 12 assists, Vlade Divac was the rebounding leader with 10 rebounds, while Jure Zdovc recorded a record 8 steals with no turnovers.

1990 World Championship
The 1990 FIBA World Championship, hosted in Argentina, was the last World Championship in which the country participated before its dissolution. In the preliminary round they placed second in Group A after Puerto Rico. They were grouped in Group A also with Venezuela, and Angola. They defeated Venezuela 92–84 in the first game, defeated Angola 92–79 in the second game, and lost 75–82 to Puerto Rico in the last game of the preliminary round.

In the second round Yugoslavia was grouped with Soviet Union, Greece and Brazil as part of Group II. They won all games, defeating Brazil 105–86, Soviet Union 100–77, and Greece 77–67.

In the Final round, Yugoslavia defeated the United States 99–91. Meanwhile, Soviet Union defeated Puerto Rico, which had been undefeated up to that point, having prevailed over the United States, Australia, host Argentina, and Yugoslavia itself.

In the final, Yugoslavia defeated Soviet Union 75–92 at the Estadio Luna Park of Buenos Aires. Jure Zdovc was the assists leader with 5 assists, and the second rebounding leader with 6 rebounds. He also scored 13 points, and was the steals leader with 4 steals. Toni Kukoč was the rebounding leader with 7 rebounds and the second assists leader with 4 assists, also scoring 14 points and stealing 2 balls. Kukoč was named MVP of the tournament. Both of them were later inducted in the FIBA Hall of Fame.

EuroBasket 1991
EuroBasket 1991 in Italy was the last tournament in which Yugoslavia participated, as the country disintegrated in the following months. The upheaval in their home country caused disruption in the national team. Already in 1990, there had been problems between Petrović and Divac. On the day before the semifinals, Jure Zdovc was forced to leave the national team, while the airport of his hometown was bombed and Slovenia declared independence.

Yugoslavia was placed in Group A in Preliminary round, with Spain, Poland, and Bulgaria. They managed to defeat Spain 76–67, and also defeated Poland 103–61 and Bulgaria 68–89, thus gaining the group's top seed, and were set to face France in semifinals. Zdovc had to leave the national team just before the semifinal, but Yugoslavia nonetheless defeated France 76–97. In the final, they defeated host Italy 88–73. Toni Kukoč
was named MVP of the tournament.

Competitions

At the Summer Olympic Games, Yugoslavia captured one gold medal (1980), took the silver medal on three occasions (1968, 76, 88) and captured the bronze medal once (1984).

At the FIBA World Championship, Yugoslavia captured three gold medals (1970, 1978 and 1990), three silver medals (1963, 1967, 1974) and two bronze medals (1982, 1986).

At the EuroBasket, Yugoslavia captured the gold medal five times (1973, 1975, 1977, 1989, 1991), were silver medalists on five occasions (1961, 1965, 1969, 1971, 1981), and captured the bronze medal four times (1963, 1979, 1987).

Performance at Olympic Games

Performance at FIBA World Cup

Performance at FIBA EuroBasket

Medals table

The dominant years in FIBA competition
The Yugoslav national team of the late 1980s and early 1990s featured what was perhaps the greatest generation in the history of Yugoslav basketball. A common quip about basketball is: "The Americans invented it, the Yugoslavs perfected it." With such players as Dražen Petrović, Vlade Divac, Toni Kukoč, Dino Rađa, Predrag Danilović, Žarko Paspalj and Jure Zdovc the country was responsible for a wave of international NBA players in the 1990s. Many of the former Yugoslav players of this era were a part of the under-21 national team that won the FIBA World Junior Championships in 1987, defeating the U.S. both in pool play and in the final.

The 1991 team is regarded by Antonello Riva as the best team in European history.

Rosters

For 1992 onwards, as Federal Republic of Yugoslavia: see Serbia and Montenegro national basketball team

Player statistics

Most appearances
Top 10 appearances

Top scorers
Top 10 scorers

Notable players

Individual awards

International competitions
 FIBA World Cup MVP
 Ivo Daneu – 1967
 Dragan Kićanović – 1974
 Dražen Dalipagić – 1978
 Dražen Petrović – 1986
 Toni Kukoč – 1990
 FIBA World Cup All-Tournament Team
 Radivoj Korać – 1967
 Ivo Daneu – 1967
 Krešimir Ćosić – 1970, 1978
 Vinko Jelovac – 1974
 Dražen Dalipagić – 1978
 Dragan Kićanović – 1978, 1982
 Dražen Petrović – 1986
 Vlade Divac – 1990
 Toni Kukoč – 1990
 FIBA EuroBasket MVP
 Radivoj Korać – 1961
 Krešimir Ćosić – 1971, 1975
 Dražen Dalipagić – 1977
 Dražen Petrović – 1989
 Toni Kukoč – 1991
 FIBA EuroBasket All-Tournament Team
 Krešimir Ćosić – 1969, 1971, 1973, 1975, 1979
 Ivo Daneu – 1969
 Dražen Dalipagić –  1975, 1977, 1981
 Dragan Kićanović – 1979, 1981 
 Dražen Petrović – 1985, 1989
 Žarko Paspalj – 1989
 Dino Rađa – 1989
 Vlade Divac – 1991
 Toni Kukoč – 1991
 FIBA EuroBasket Top Scorer
 Radivoj Korać – 1959, 1961, 1963, 1965

Other notable achievements 
 FIBA Hall of Fame
 Radivoj Korać
 Ivo Daneu
 Krešimir Ćosić 
 Zoran Slavnić
 Dražen Dalipagić
 Dragan Kićanović
 Mirza Delibašić
 Dražen Petrović 
 Vlade Divac
 Toni Kukoč 
 Jure Zdovc
 Naismith Memorial Basketball Hall of Fame
 Krešimir Ćosić 
 Dražen Dalipagić
 Dražen Petrović 
 Vlade Divac
 Dino Rađa
 Toni Kukoč 
 Radivoj Korać 
 Euroscar
 Dražen Dalipagić – 1980
 Dragan Kićanović – 1981, 1982
 Dražen Petrović – 1986, 1989
 Toni Kukoč – 1990, 1991
 Mr. Europa
 Dražen Dalipagić – 1977, 1978
 Dragan Kićanović – 1981, 1982
 Dražen Petrović – 1986
 Vlade Divac – 1989
 Toni Kukoč – 1990, 1991
 EuroLeague Final Four MVP
 Dino Rađa – 1989
 Toni Kukoč – 1990, 1991
50 Greatest EuroLeague Contributors (2008)
 Radivoj Korać
 Krešimir Ćosić 
 Dražen Dalipagić
 Dragan Kićanović
 Mirza Delibašić
 Dražen Petrović 
 Toni Kukoč
 Vlade Divac
 Aleksandar Đorđević
 Predrag Danilović

Head coaches

Manager history
1947–1950 – Stevica Čolović
1950–1953 – Nebojša Popović
1954–1965 – Aleksandar Nikolić
1965–1972 – Ranko Žeravica
1973–1976 – Mirko Novosel
1977–1978 – Aleksandar Nikolić
1979 – Petar Skansi
1980 – Ranko Žeravica
1981 – Bogdan Tanjević
1982 – Ranko Žeravica
1983 – Josip Gjergja
1984 – Mirko Novosel
1985–1987 – Krešimir Ćosić
1988–1991 – Dušan Ivković

Individual achievements 
 FIBA Hall of Fame
 Krešimir Ćosić (as player)
 Aleksandar Nikolić
 Ranko Žeravica
 Mirko Novosel
 Dušan Ivković 
 Nebojša Popović (as contributor)
 Bogdan Tanjević
 Naismith Memorial Basketball Hall of Fame
 Krešimir Ćosić (as player)
 Aleksandar Nikolić
 Mirko Novosel
EuroLeague Basketball Legend Award
 Dušan Ivković 
50 Greatest EuroLeague Contributors (2008)
 Aleksandar Nikolić
 Dušan Ivković
EuroLeague-winning head coach
 Aleksandar Nikolić – 1970, 1972, 1973
 Bogdan Tanjević – 1979
 Mirko Novosel – 1985
Triple Crown
 Aleksandar Nikolić – 1973
 Mirko Novosel – 1985

New national teams
After the dissolution of SFR Yugoslavia in 1992, five new countries were created: Bosnia and Herzegovina, Croatia, North Macedonia, FR Yugoslavia (in 2003, renamed to Serbia and Montenegro) and Slovenia. In 2006, Montenegro became an independent nation and Serbia became the legal successor of Serbia and Montenegro. In 2008, Kosovo declared independence from Serbia and became a FIBA member in 2015.

Here is a list of men's national teams on the SFR Yugoslavia area:
  (1992–present)
  (1992–present)
  (1993–present)
  (1992–2006)
  (2006–present)
  (2006–present)
  (2015–present)
  (1992–present)

After the breakup of Yugoslavia in 1991, clubs, leagues and national teams of the successor state basketball associations continued the so-called "Yugoslav school of basketball" tradition, with some continuing to produce top results and exhibited strong performance in international competitions, both at world and continental stage. Particularly successful over the years, since break-up of former common country, was Serbia and Montenegro and now Serbia. Croatia too had some measurable success immediately after the break-up, with Slovenia winning their first ever international tournament after defeating Serbia at EuroBasket 2017. Other national teams also continued to exhibited strong performance over the years, by competing on international stage in different competitions, with Bosnia, Montenegro, and Macedonia, all qualifying regularly for EuroBasket, and other big tournaments.

References

External links
Yugoslavia participation – FIBA archive
Yugoslavia at fibaeurope.com

 
Former national basketball teams
FIBA EuroBasket-winning countries
 
Articles containing video clips